The Topa is a right tributary of the river Holod in Romania. It flows into the Holod near Copăceni.

Tributaries

The following rivers are tributaries to the Topa:

Left: Miniș, Poiana, Rogoazele, Vârciorog, Valea Copilului, Valea lui Vasile
Right: Valea Codrului, Pietroasa, Valea Mare, Cârpeștii Mici, Valea Florii

References

Rivers of Romania
Rivers of Bihor County